The treaty for the establishment of the East African  Community was signed on 30 November 1999. It entered into force on 7 July 2000 following its ratification by the original three  Partner States – Kenya, Uganda and Tanzania. Rwanda and Burundi acceded to the treaty on 18 June 2007, and became full members of the community effective 1 July 2007. The accord established the East African Community whereby all participating nations agreed to establish more cooperative commercial and political relations for their cumulative 133 million citizens.

See also
List of treaties

References

Treaties of Kenya
Treaties of Uganda
Treaties of Tanzania
East African Community
2000 in Kenya
2000 in Uganda
2000 in Tanzania
Treaties concluded in 1999
Treaties entered into force in 2000